Baranova is a rural locality (a village) in Stepanovskoye Rural Settlement, Kudymkarsky District, Perm Krai, Russia. The population was 31 as of 2010.

Geography 
It is located 7 km south-east from Kudymkar.

References 

Rural localities in Kudymkarsky District